Whitewater Dyke is a tributary of the Great Stour river, joining with the East Stour and then the Great Stour at Pledge's Mill at the bottom of East Hill in Ashford, Kent, England.

The stream runs from its source near Shadoxhurst, 5.6 kilometres, to the East Stour in Willesborough.

References  

Rivers of Kent
Borough of Ashford